The first USS Downes (DD-45) was a  in the United States Navy during World War I. She was later transferred to the United States Coast Guard, where she was designated CG-4. She was named for Captain John Downes.

Construction
Downes was launched on 8 November 1913 by New York Shipbuilding Company of Camden, New Jersey. She was sponsored by Mrs. M. H. Simons, great-granddaughter of Captain Downes and outfitted for service at Philadelphia Navy Yard. Downes was commissioned on 11 February 1915.

World War I
Downes conducted her shakedown off New York and in Chesapeake Bay, and then returned to Philadelphia Navy Yard, where she was placed in ordinary from 4 October 1915 – 26 May 1917 for the construction and installation of new machinery by the contractor. Fitted out for distant service, she sailed from New York on 18 October 1917 for Devonport, England, arriving on 7 November.

Downes was based at Queenstown, Ireland, from 17 November 1917 – 5 December 1918, and operated on convoy escort duty inbound to British ports, across the channel, and outbound to rendezvous with the ocean escorts. She patrolled against submarines off the Irish coast, making numerous attacks with no sure results and with other destroyers aided distressed ships. On two occasions her efficiency won commendations from the British Admiralty, once for her protection of the torpedoed  and again for the rescue and salvage of a British submarine.

Inter-war period
The day after Christmas she sailed for the United States, arriving at Norfolk, Virginia on 18 January 1919. After winter maneuvers in Cuban waters, she returned to New York on 14 March. Downes reported to Norfolk on 5 May for overhaul and on 31 May was placed in ordinary. Returned to full commission, she sailed for Newport, Rhode Island on 12 May 1921 for summer maneuvers.

From 22 October – 20 March 1922, she lay at Charleston, South Carolina, and on 24 March arrived at Philadelphia Navy Yard. Downes was placed out of commission there on 6 June and laid up.

She was transferred to the United States Coast Guard on 28 April 1924. She initially served at the Academy as a practice ship. Later, she was part of the Rum Patrol. Returned to Naval custody at Philadelphia on 22 May 1931, Downes was scrapped and sold on 22 August 1934 in accordance with the London Naval Treaty.

References

External links

Cassin-class destroyers
World War I destroyers of the United States
Ships transferred from the United States Navy to the United States Coast Guard
Ships built by New York Shipbuilding Corporation
1913 ships